Robert Norton Geary (May 10, 1891 – January 3, 1980) was an American Major League Baseball pitcher. He played for the Philadelphia Athletics during the 1918 and 1919 seasons and the Cincinnati Reds during the 1921 season.

In 1918 Geary served in the military during World War I.

References

Major League Baseball pitchers
Cincinnati Reds players
Philadelphia Athletics players
Albany Babies players
Americus Muckalees players
Columbia Comers players
Dallas Steers players
San Francisco Seals (baseball) players
Seattle Rainiers players
Baseball players from Cincinnati
1891 births
1980 deaths